The 1973–74 Liga Bet season saw Hapoel Beit She'an, Maccabi Hadera, Beitar Jaffa and Hapoel Ashkelon win their regional divisions and qualify with the second-placed clubs, Beitar Tiberias, Hapoel Mahane Yehuda, Hapoel Kfar Shalem and Maccabi Yavne for promotion play-offs against the bottom two clubs of both North and South divisions in Liga Alef. Maccabi Hadera and Beitar Jaffa were the only Liga Bet clubs who achieved promotion to Liga Alef.

On same basis, promotion-relegation play-offs contested between the bottom Liga Bet clubs and the top Liga Gimel clubs.

North Division A

North Division B

South Division A

South Division B

Promotion play-offs

North play-offs

Beitar Tiberias suspended from the play-offs due to crowd trouble against Hapoel Beit She'an.

South play-offs

Relegation play-offs

North A play-offs

Beitar Acre withdrew from the play-offs and relegated to Liga Gimel.

North B play-offs

South A play-offs

South B play-offs

References
One play-off team to be determined Maariv, 23.6.74, Historical Jewish Press 
Jaffa and Ramla will play in Liga Alef Davar, 21.7.74, Historical Jewish Press 
Seven promoted teams to Liga Bet determined Davar, 21.7.74, Historical Jewish Press 

Liga Bet seasons
Israel
3